Lee Ho-suk (Hanja: 李昊錫, ; born June 25, 1986) is a South Korean short track speedskater. He won a gold medal as a part of 5000 m short-track relay team and four silver medals in 2006 Winter Olympics held in Turin, Italy. He is the overall world champion for 2009 and 2010.

Career
Known especially for his dynamic outside pass, Lee is regarded as one of the best young skaters in the world. At the 2006 Winter Olympics, Lee made a thrilling move to pass Apolo Ohno on the final lap of the 1000 m, securing a 1-2 finish for Korea in the event.

Lee won three consecutive overall World Junior titles from 2003 to 2005. In 2006, his first full season on the World Cup circuit, Lee finished second behind Ahn Hyun-Soo in the overall standings. At the 2006 Winter Olympics, Lee earned two individual silver medals in the 1000 and 1500 meters behind his teammate, Ahn Hyun-Soo at the 2006 Winter Olympics in Turin, Italy. Lee also won gold in the 5000 meter relay along with countrymen Ahn Hyun-Soo, Seo Ho-Jin and Song Suk-Woo. The Korean team defeated two-time defending Olympic champion Canada with a powerful pass by Ahn in the closing laps. Lee also finished second overall at the 2006 Short Track World  Championships held in Minneapolis, MN.

At the 2009 World Short Track Speed Skating Championships in Vienna, Lee became the Overall World Champion and went on to win his domestic Olympic Trials a few months later, becoming the leader of the Korean Short Track Team, as well as one of the top contenders to win gold in 2010 Winter Olympics in Vancouver, British Columbia, Canada.

At the 2010 Winter Olympics, South Korea was in position to sweep the 1500m until Lee accidentally crashed into Sung Si-Bak and took them both out of contention entering the final turn, giving the silver and bronze medals to Americans Apolo Ohno and J. R. Celski, respectively. He was disqualified because he caused the crash with Sung Si-Bak. He qualified for the final round of the quarter finals of the 1000m short track race with a time of 1:25.925. Lee won his second consecutive Overall World Championships after the Olympics.

See also 
 South Korea at the 2006 Winter Olympics
 South Korea at the 2010 Winter Olympics

References

External links
 Lee Ho-Suk's biography on nbcolympics.com

Short track speed skaters at the 2002 Winter Olympics
Short track speed skaters at the 2006 Winter Olympics
Short track speed skaters at the 2010 Winter Olympics
Short track speed skaters at the 2014 Winter Olympics
South Korean male short track speed skaters
1986 births
Living people
Olympic short track speed skaters of South Korea
Olympic gold medalists for South Korea
Olympic silver medalists for South Korea
Speed skaters from Seoul
Olympic medalists in short track speed skating
Medalists at the 2010 Winter Olympics
Medalists at the 2006 Winter Olympics
Asian Games medalists in short track speed skating
Short track speed skaters at the 2007 Asian Winter Games
Short track speed skaters at the 2011 Asian Winter Games
Medalists at the 2007 Asian Winter Games
Medalists at the 2011 Asian Winter Games
Asian Games gold medalists for South Korea
21st-century South Korean people